Volodymyr Chemerys (born October 19, 1962 in Konotop) is a Ukrainian politician and human rights activist. Chemerys was a member of the Verkhovna Rada (parliament) of the second convocation (1994–1998), but he is mostly known as one of informal leaders of the Ukraine without Kuchma mass protest campaign of 2000–2001.

Early political career
Volodymyr Chemerys is a founding member of the Ukrainian Helsinki Union—one of the first perestroika organizations in Ukraine advocating renessaince of national culture and independence (now a human rights-advocating group)

He also took part in the legendary 1991 student protests in Kyiv.

Chemerys was elected to the Verkhovna Rada from a Frankivsky constituency #265 in the city of Lviv, after nominated and supported by the right-centrist Ukrainian Republican Party. Chemerys says he was mostly relying on people-to-people communications and small group of dedicated campaign volunteers so that the whole campaigning cost him and the party as low as U.S. $600.

Later, Volodymyr Chemerys was also elected as the regional party leader in the city of Kyiv.

UWK and other anti-Kuchma campaigns

In 2000, Volodymyr Chemerys co-founded the "Ukraine without Kuchma" campaign. A co-founder of the Ukraine Without Kuchma and a member of the NSF, Chemerys has been an effective public speaker and an active negotiator. For example, in an address to parliament, Chemerys described the disappearance of journalist Georgiy Gongadze and the audio tapes presented by Socialist leader Oleksandr Moroz apparently implicating President Kuchma as "the last drop that filled the cup of distrust in the authorities. In addition, he was one of the representatives of the campaign received by their political enemy President Kuchma.

Chemerys has also been active participant of subsequent protest campaigns started by the opposition against Leonid Kuchma. During one protest in March 2001, Chemerys was hospitalized with a head injury along with Andriy Shkil, the leader of the right-wing UNA-UNSO party. While in the hospital, Chemerys learned that a warrant for his arrest had been issued.

Chemerys in the Orange Revolution

Unlike predominant majority of his UWK co-participants, Volodymyr Chemerys was sceptical to Viktor Yuschenko during the 2004 presidential election and even participated in the marginal "Ashamed to vote!" campaign (meaning "for any of the candidates").

Recent developments
In September 2006, Chemerys visited Prairie Village, Kansas, United States on one stop on a three-week nationwide tour to witness and explore democracy in real life. Chemerys was presented to the city as a board member of the Institute for Social and Economic Studies and Ukrainian Helsinki Human Rights Union.

Despite his political start in a rightist party, Volodymyr Chemerys is now declaring leftist views. He is currently heading the "Respublica" Institute - a left-liberal non-governmental organization. Its most known project is advocacy of the freedom of assembly and oversight of police attitude towards participants of political rallies and mass events. 

Recently, Chemerys participated in a public investigation of a loud police brutality scandal concerning clashes on a Ukrainian Football Cup-2007 final game held at the Olimpiysky Stadium.

In 2011 Volodymyr Chemerys and other civic activists have started a National Initiative “For Peaceful Protest!”, a voluntary coalition of independent NGOs from all over the country, which stand against attempts to limit the right to peaceful assembly in Ukraine (http://www.zmina.org.ua). 

Chemerys is also leading the continuous public campaign aimed to remembrance of Taras Protsiuk, Ukrainian TV-cameraman killed during Iraq War by U.S. tank fire, and proper investigation of the death. As part of the campaign, the activists conduct occasional protest vigils of the United States embassy in Kyiv with a slogan "Bush, we remember that!".

See also
 Politics of Ukraine
 Activism

References

External links
 Volodymyr Chemerys profile on parliamentary web-site
 2005 interview on police actions on mass events, Glavred
 2006 interview on public control over police
 2007 article, Ukrayinska Pravda

1962 births
Living people
People from Konotop
Second convocation members of the Verkhovna Rada
Ukrainian Helsinki Group
Independent politicians in Ukraine
Ukrainian Helsinki Human Rights Union
People of the Revolution on Granite
People of Ukraine without Kuchma